The 2002–03 BBL season was the 16th campaign in the history of the British Basketball League.

Teams

Notable occurrences 
 Attracted by the opening of the brand-new 4,000-seat Braehead Arena in Glasgow, Edinburgh Rocks uprooted from their aging Meadowbank venue in Edinburgh and moved 45 miles west to Scotland's largest city Glasgow, and rebranded as the Scottish Rocks. The move received a mixed response from fans; whilst many said that the move would not work, the official supporters club backed the franchise's decision.
 Although based in Brentwood, Essex for the past two years, Greater London Leopards eventually rebranded the franchise as the Essex Leopards prior to the season starting.
 Due to a decreasing membership, the league abolished the Conference system it had imposed for the past three seasons and returned the regular single-league table set-up, with the top eight teams progressing to the play-offs.

BBL Championship (Tier 1)

Final standings

The play-offs

Quarter-finals

Semi-finals

Final

National League Conference (Tier 2)

Final standings

National Cup

Last 16

Quarter-finals

Semi-finals

Final

BBL Trophy 
This season's BBL Trophy featured all 11 BBL teams plus one invited teams from the English Basketball League, the Teesside Mohawks to bring the total number of teams divided evenly. The First round saw all 12 teams split into four regionalised groups with the top finishing team advancing to the semi-finals.

Group stage 

Northern Group 1

Southern Group 1

Northern Group 2

Southern Group 2

Semi-finals

Final

Statistics leaders

References 

British Basketball League seasons
1
British